WJHC (107.5 MHz) is an FM radio station licensed to Jasper, Florida.  The station broadcasts a talk radio format and is owned by Smalltown Broadcasting, LLC.

References

External links
WJHC's official website

Talk radio stations in the United States
JHC